Ghana participated at the 2018 Summer Youth Olympics in Buenos Aires, Argentina from 6 October to 18 October 2018.

Competitors

Athletics

Boys

Beach volleyball

Swimming

Boys

Weightlifting

Ghana qualified one athletes based on its performance at the 2018 African Youth Championships.

References

2018 in Ghanaian sport
Nations at the 2018 Summer Youth Olympics
Ghana at the Youth Olympics